The 2017 Laois Senior Football Championship was the 127th edition of the Laois GAA's premier club Gaelic football tournament for senior graded teams in County Laois, Ireland. The tournament consisted of 16 teams with the winner going on to represent Laois in the Leinster Senior Club Football Championship. The championship had a back-door format for the first two rounds before proceeding to a knock-out format. Generally, any team to lose two matches will be knocked out of the championship.

Stradbally were the defending champions after they defeated Portlaoise in the previous years final.

O'Dempsey's made a straight return to the senior grade after just one year outside the top flight. For this season Clonaslee–St Manman's amalgamated with Annanough for their championship matches as Clonaslee Gaels. Annanough continue to play in the IFC also.
 
Mountmellick were relegated to the 2018 I.F.C. after 11 years in the top-flight.

Team Changes
The following teams have changed division since the 2016 championship season.

To S.F.C.
Promoted from 2016 Laois Intermediate Football Championship
 O'Dempsey's  -  (Intermediate Champions)

From S.F.C.
Relegated to 2017 Laois Intermediate Football Championship
 Emo

Round 1
All 16 teams enter the competition in this round. The 8 winners progress to Round 2A while the 8 losers progress to Round 2B.

Round 2

Round 2A
The 8 winners from Round 1 enter this round. The 4 winners will enter the draw for the quarter finals while the 4 losers will play in Round 3.

Round 2B
The 8 losers from Round 1 enter this round. The 4 winners will go into the Round 3 while the 4 losers will enter the Relegation Playoffs.

Round 3
The 4 losers from Round 2A enter this round and they play the 4 winners from Round 2B. The 4 winners will go into the draw for the quarter-finals.

Quarter-finals

Semi-finals

Final

Relegation playoff

Relegation Semi-Finals

Relegation Final

Leinster Senior Club Football Championship

References

Laois Senior Football Championship
Laois Senior Football Championship